Ryota Kajikawa (梶川 諒太, born April 17, 1989) is a Japanese football player for Tokyo Verdy.

Club statistics
Updated to end of 2018 season.

References

External links
Profile at Tokyo Verdy 
Profile at V-Varen Nagasaki 

1989 births
Living people
Kwansei Gakuin University alumni
Association football people from Hyōgo Prefecture
Japanese footballers
J1 League players
J2 League players
Tokyo Verdy players
Shonan Bellmare players
V-Varen Nagasaki players
Tokushima Vortis players
Association football midfielders